Karen A. Ritter (born February 28, 1953) is a former Democratic member of the Pennsylvania House of Representatives.

References

Democratic Party members of the Pennsylvania House of Representatives
Women state legislators in Pennsylvania
Living people
1953 births
People from Shirley, Massachusetts
21st-century American women